General Sir Edward Cooper Hodge  (19 April 1810 – 10 December 1894) was a British Army officer.

Biography

Hodge was the son of Major Edward Hodge (1782–1815) of the 7th Hussars, who distinguished himself in the Peninsula War and in the Waterloo Campaign.

As a Lieutenant-Colonel, Edward Cooper Hodge commanded the 4th (Royal Irish) Regiment of Dragoon Guards at the Battle of Balaclava. He was subsequently placed in command of the 5th Dragoon Guards, and later rose to the rank of General.

Hodge was the author of a diary, edited by the Marquess of Anglesey and published as Little Hodge: Being Extracts from the Diaries and Letters of Colonel Edward Cooper Hodge Written During the Crimean War, 1854-1856

He is buried in Brompton Cemetery, London.

Family
In 1860 Edward Cooper Hodge married Lucy Anne, second daughter of James Rimingt'on. Esq, of Broomhead Hall, Yorkshire

Notes

References

Further reading
 
 

|-

1810 births
1894 deaths
British Army generals
Knights Grand Cross of the Order of the Bath
English non-fiction writers
Burials at Brompton Cemetery
4th Royal Irish Dragoon Guards officers
British Army personnel of the Crimean War
Place of birth missing
Place of death missing
British diarists
People from Weymouth, Dorset
Recipients of the Order of the Medjidie
English male non-fiction writers
English Freemasons
19th-century diarists